Feels So Good is the fifth album by jazz saxophonist Grover Washington Jr., recorded and released in 1975. The album topped both the soul and jazz albums charts and peaked at number ten on the pop album charts in the U.S.

Reception
Jason Ankeny of AllMusic stated "The aptly titled and much-sampled Feels So Good represents the creative apex of Grover Washington, Jr.'s sublime electric funk sound. Its shimmering, soulful grooves refute the argument that smooth jazz is little more than mere ambience, combining expert playing and intricate songwriting to create music that is both compelling and comforting. Arranger Bob James is in top form here, creating the spacious, rich milieus that are his trademark, but regardless of the name above the title, bassist Louis Johnson is the real star of the show. His supple rhythms percolate like coffee, adding oomph to the bottom of highlights "Hydra" and "Knucklehead" while Washington's cream-and-sugar soprano sax solos soar over the top".

Track listing
"The Sea Lion" – (Bob James) – 5:57
"Moonstreams" – (Grover Washington Jr.) – 5:55
"Knucklehead" – (Washington) – 7:53
"It Feels So Good" – (Ralph MacDonald, William Salter) – 8:14
"Hydra" – (Washington) – 9:08

Personnel 
 Grover Washington Jr. – soprano saxophone, tenor saxophone 
 Bob James – acoustic piano, electric piano, synthesizers, arrangements
 Eric Gale – guitars
 Gary King – bass (1, 2, 3)
 Louis Johnson – bass (4, 5)
 Steve Gadd – drums (1, 2)
 Jimmy Madison – drums (3)
 Kenneth "Spider Webb" Rice – drums (4, 5)
 Ralph MacDonald – percussion
 Sid Weinberg – oboe, English horn

Brass Section
 Alan Raph and Dave Taylor – bass trombone
 Barry Rogers – trombone
 Randy Brecker, Jon Faddis, John Frosk and Bob Millikan – trumpet, flugelhorn

String Section
 Seymour Barab and Charles McCracken – cello
 Alfred Brown and Emanuel Vardi – viola
 Lewis Eley, Max Ellen, Barry Finclair, Emanuel Green, Harry Lookofsky, Guy Lumia, David Nadien and Raoul Poliakin – violin

Production 
 Creed Taylor – producer 
 Rudy Van Gelder – engineer 
 Rene Schumacher – design 
 Alen MacWeeney – photography

Charts

References

External links
 Grover Washington Jr. – Feels So Good at Discogs

1975 albums
Grover Washington Jr. albums
Kudu Records albums
Albums produced by Creed Taylor
Albums recorded at Van Gelder Studio